Reasonable Doubt is a 1936 British comedy film directed by George King starring John Stuart and Nancy Burne. It was produced by the Hungarian Gabriel Pascal.

The story follows a lawyer (Stuart) whose love for a young girl (Burne) causes him to defend the man he thinks to be her lover. During the trial the lawyer finds out that the man is his own son.

The film was made at Shepperton Studios as a quota quickie.

Cast
 John Stuart as Noel Hampton 
 Nancy Burne as Pat 
 Marjorie Taylor 
 Ivan Brandt as Tony  
 Marie Lohr 
 Clifford Heatherley 
 H. F. Maltby 
 Cecil Humphreys 
 Fred Duprez 
 Cynthia Stock

References

Bibliography
 Chibnall, Steve. Quota Quickies: The Birth of the British 'B' Film. British Film Institute, 2007.
 Low, Rachael. Filmmaking in 1930s Britain. George Allen & Unwin, 1985.

External links
 

1936 films
1936 comedy films
British black-and-white films
British comedy films
Films directed by George King
Films produced by Gabriel Pascal
Films shot at Shepperton Studios
Quota quickies
1930s English-language films
1930s British films